Max Ludwig (22 April 1896 – 26 September 1957) was a German bobsledder who competed in the early 1930s. He won the bronze medal in the four-man event at the 1932 Winter Olympics in Lake Placid and finished seventh in the two-man event at those same games. He was also a painter, and his work was part of the painting event in the art competition at the 1936 Summer Olympics.

References

External links
1932 bobsleigh two-man results
Bobsleigh four-man Olympic medalists for 1924, 1932-56, and since 1964
DatabaseOlympics.com profile

1896 births
1957 deaths
German male bobsledders
Olympic bobsledders of Germany
Bobsledders at the 1932 Winter Olympics
Olympic bronze medalists for Germany
Olympic medalists in bobsleigh
Medalists at the 1932 Winter Olympics
20th-century German painters
20th-century German male artists
German male painters
Olympic competitors in art competitions